The Great Basin is the largest region of contiguous endorheic drainage basins in North America, and is encompassed by the Great Basin Divide.

Utah
 Great Salt Lake (Idaho, Utah, Wyoming)  
 Bear River (Idaho, Utah, Wyoming)  
 Malad River (Idaho, Utah)  
 Little Bear River (Idaho, Utah)  
 Bear Lake (Idaho, Utah)  
 Weber River (Utah, Wyoming)  
 Jordan River (Utah)  
 Utah Lake (Utah)  
 Provo River (Utah)  
 Spanish Fork (Utah)  
 Skull Valley (Utah)  
 Deep Creek (Curlew Valley) (Idaho, Utah)  
 Pine Valley (Utah)  
 Tule Valley (Utah)  
 Rush Valley (Utah)  
 Bonneville Salt Flats (Nevada, Utah)  
 Fish Springs Wash (Utah)  
 Snake Valley (Nevada, Utah)  
 Hamlin Valley (Nevada, Utah)  
 Deep Creek (Deep Creek Valley) (Nevada, Utah)  
 Newfoundland Evaporation Basin (Nevada, Utah)  
 Grouse Creek (Nevada, Utah)  
 Thousand Springs Creek (Nevada, Utah)  
 Sevier Lake (Utah)  
 Sevier River (Utah)  
 Beaver River (Utah)  
 San Pitch River (Utah)  
 East Fork Sevier River (Utah)  
 Pavant Valley (Utah)   Most of Pavant Valley drains to the Sevier River artificially via the Central Utah Canal. 
 Sevier Desert (Utah)  
 Mud Spring Wash (Utah)  
 Little Salt Lake (Utah)  
 Escalante Desert (Nevada, Utah)  
 Wah Wah Valley (Utah)

Nevada
 Carson Sink (California, Nevada)  
 Humboldt River (Nevada)  
 Little Humboldt River  
 Reese River (Nevada)  
 Cain Creek (Nevada)  
 Rock Creek (Nevada)  
 Coyote Creek (Crescent Valley) (Nevada)  
 Cooks Creek (Nevada)  
 Pine Creek (Nevada)  
 South Fork Humboldt River (Nevada)  
 Huntington Creek (Nevada)  
 North Fork Humboldt River (Nevada)  
 Marys River (Nevada)  
 Carson River (California, Nevada)  
 East Fork Carson River (California, Nevada)  
 Stillwater Marsh (Nevada)  
 Black Rock Desert (Nevada, Oregon)  
 Quinn River (Nevada, Oregon)  
 Bottle Creek Slough (Desert Valley) (Nevada)  
 High Rock Lake (Nevada)  
 Smoke Creek Desert (California, Nevada)  
 Duck Lake (California, Nevada)  
 Thousand Creek (Nevada, Oregon)  
 Pyramid Lake (California, Nevada)  
 Truckee River (California, Nevada)  
 Lake Tahoe (California, Nevada)  
 Blue Wing Flat (Granite Springs Valley) (Nevada)  
 Walker Lake (California, Nevada)  
 Walker River (California, Nevada)  
 East Walker River (California, Nevada)  
 West Walker River (California, Nevada)  
 Buffalo Valley (Nevada)  
 Buena Vista Valley (Nevada)  
 Humboldt Salt Marsh (Nevada)  
 Spring Creek (Nevada)  
 Gabbs Valley (Nevada)  
 Big Smoky Valley (Nevada)  
 Peavine Creek (Nevada)  
 Ione Valley (Nevada)  
 Grass Valley (Nevada)  
 Rock Creek (Nevada)  
 Wadsworth Creek (Monitor Valley) (Nevada)  
 Diamond Valley (Nevada)  
 Slough Creek (Nevada)  
 Antelope Wash (Nevada)  
 Coils Creek (Nevada)  
 Stoneberger Creek (Nevada)  
 Newark Lake (Nevada)  
 Fish Creek (Nevada)  
 Long Valley (Nevada)  
 Franklin Lake (Nevada)  
 Cole Creek (Independence Valley) (Nevada)  
 Yelland Dry Lake (Nevada)  
 Spring Valley Creek (Nevada)  
 Goshute Lake (Nevada)  
 Duck Creek (Nevada)  
 Goshute Valley (Nevada)  
 Lake Valley (Nevada)  
 Dry Lake Valley (Nevada)  
 Fish Lake Valley (California, Nevada)  
 Mud Lake (Nevada)  
 Stone Cabin Creek (Nevada)  
 Ralston Valley (Nevada)  
 Clayton Valley (Nevada)  
 Butterfield Marsh (Nevada)  
 Railroad Valley (Nevada)  
 Hot Creek (Nevada)  
 Duckwater Creek (Nevada)  
 Sand Springs Wash (Nevada)  
 Gold Flat (Nevada)  
 Sarcobatus Flat (Nevada)  
 China Wash (Lida Valley) (Nevada)  
 Coal Valley (Nevada)  
 Sand Spring Valley (Nevada)  
 Groom Lake (Nevada)  
 Desert Valley (Nevada)  
 Tikaboo Valley (Nevada)  
 Indian Springs Valley (Nevada)  
 Mesquite Valley (California, Nevada)  
 Eldorado Valley (Nevada)

Oregon
 Malheur Lake (Oregon)  
 Malheur Slough (Oregon)  
 Silvies River (Oregon)  
 Donner und Blitzen River (Oregon)  
 Harney Lake (Oregon)  
 Silver Creek (Oregon)  
 Silver Lake (Oregon)  
 Silver Creek (Oregon)  
 Lake Abert (Oregon)  
 Chewaucan River (Oregon)  
 Bluejoint Lake (Warner Lakes) (California, Nevada, Oregon)  
 Crump Lake (California, Nevada, Oregon)  
 Guano Lake (Nevada, Oregon)  
 Catlow Valley (Oregon)  
 Guano Slough (Oregon)  
 Alvord Lake (Nevada, Oregon)

California
 Goose Lake (California, Oregon)  
 Madeline Plains (California, Nevada)  
 Honey Lake (California, Nevada)  
 Susan River (California)  
 Mono Lake (California, Nevada)  
 Owens Lake (California, Nevada)  
 Owens River (California, Nevada)  
 Spring Canyon Creek (California, Nevada)  
 Eureka Valley (California, Nevada)  
 Salt Lake (California)  
 Amargosa River (California, Nevada)  
 Salt Creek (California, Nevada)  
 Death Valley Wash (California, Nevada)  
 Salt Creek (California)  
 Kingston Wash (California)  
 Rock Valley (California, Nevada)  
 Fortymile Canyon (California, Nevada)  
 Panamint Valley (northern) (California)  
 Panamint Valley (southern) (California)  
 China Lake (California)  
 Searles Lake (California)  
 Koehn Lake (California)  
 Rogers Dry Lake (California)  
 Rosamond Lake (California)  
 Harper Lake (California)  
 Silver Lake  
 Soda Lake  
 Mojave River (California)  
 Kelso Wash (California)  
 Ivanpah Lake (California, Nevada)  
 Dale Lake (California)  
 Bristol Lake (California)  
 Cadiz Lake (California)  
 Schuyler Wash (California)  
 Watson Wash (California)  
 Danby Lake (California)  
 Homer Wash (California)  
 Ford Dry Lake (California)  
 Palen Lake (California)  
 Pinto Wash (California)  
 Salton Sea (California, Mexico)  
 Whitewater River (California)  
 San Felipe Creek (California, Mexico)  
 Carrizo Creek (California, Mexico)  
 New River (California, Mexico)  
 Alamo River (California, Mexico)  
 Lake Elsinore (California) 
 San Jacinto River

Mexico
 Laguna Salada (Mexico)

References

See also
 List of rivers of the Great Basin
 Landforms of the Great Basin
 Watersheds of the United States

Lakes of the Great Basin
.
.
Great Basin
Geography of the Western United States
Great Basin
Great Basin

de:Great Basin
es:Basin gránde
fr:Great Basin
fi:Great Basin